Defending champion Diede de Groot defeated Yui Kamiji in the final, 4–6, 6–1, 6–4 to win the women's singles wheelchair tennis title at the 2019 US Open.

Seeds

Draw

Finals

External links 

 Draw

Wheelchair Women's Singles
U.S. Open, 2019 Women's Singles